Energy Policy is a monthly peer-reviewed academic journal covering research on energy policy and energy supply. It is published by Elsevier. According to the Journal Citation Reports, Energy Policy has a 2020 impact factor of 6.142,ranking it 19 out of 376 in category of "Economics".

References

External links 
 

Elsevier academic journals
Publications established in 1973
English-language journals
Energy and fuel journals
Monthly journals